Jules Vuillemin (15 February 1920 – 16 January 2001) was a French philosopher, Professor of Philosophy of Knowledge at the prestigious Collège de France, in Paris, from 1962 to 1990, succeeding Maurice Merleau-Ponty, and Professor emeritus from 1991 to 2001. He was an Invited Professor at the Institute for Advanced Study, in Princeton, New Jersey (1968).

At the Collège de France, Vuillemin introduced analytical philosophy to France. Vuillemin’s thought had a major influence on Jacques Bouveresse's works. Vuillemin himself vindicated the legacy of Martial Gueroult.

A friend of Michel Foucault, he supported his election at the Collège de France, and was also close to Michel Serres.

Biography 
After studying at the Ecole Normale Supérieure, he completed his agrégation in 1943, being received premier ex aequo alongside Tran Duc Thao. A student of French historical epistemologists Gaston Bachelard and Jean Cavaillès, he was however at first influenced by phenomenology and existentialism, before shifting towards study of logics and science. In 1962, he published a book titled The Philosophy of Algebra, dedicated to the mathematician Pierre Samuel, a member of the Bourbaki group, as well as to René Thom, to the physicist Raymond Siestrunck and to the linguist George Vallet. Vuillemin thought that renewals of methods in mathematics have influenced philosophy, thus relating the discovery of irrational numbers to Platonism, algebraic geometry to Cartesianism, infinitesimal calculus to Gottfried Wilhelm Leibniz. Furthermore, he observed that philosophy had not yet taken into account the changes brought to mathematics by Joseph Louis Lagrange and Évariste Galois.

In 1968, he co-founded with Gilles-Gaston Granger the journal L’Âge de la Science. He was one of the main commentators of Bertrand Russell, Ludwig Wittgenstein, Rudolf Carnap and Willard Van Orman Quine in France.

Vuillemin also took an interest into aesthetics, beside writing several books on Kant, Anselm or on Diodorus's master argument (see problem of future contingents).

Jules Vuillemin’s Archives 
The Jules Vuillemin's Archives are located in France at the Laboratoire d'Histoire des Sciences et de Philosophie - Archives Henri Poincaré.

Gilles-Gaston Granger was, until his death in 2016, the president of the scientific committee of Jules Vuillemin's Archives.

Bibliography 
 Le Sens du destin, en collaboration avec Louis Guillermit, Neuchâtel, Éditions de La Baconnière, 1948.
 Essai sur la signification de la mort, Paris, PUF, 1948.
 L'Être et le travail. Les conditions dialectiques de la psychologie et de la sociologie, Paris, PUF, 1949.
 L'héritage kantien et la révolution copernicienne. Fichte — Cohen — Heidegger, Paris, PUF, 1954.
 Physique et métaphysique kantiennes, Paris, PUF, 1955, rééd. PUF, coll. Dito, 1987.
 Mathématiques et métaphysique chez Descartes, Paris, PUF, 1960, rééd. PUF, 1987.
 La Philosophie de l'algèbre, Vol. I : Recherches sur quelques concepts et méthodes de l'Algèbre Moderne. Paris, PUF, 1962, rééd. 1993.
 De la Logique à la théologie. Cinq études sur Aristote, Paris, Flammarion, 1967, nouvelle version remaniée et augmentée par l'auteur / editée et prefacée par T. Benatouil. - Louvain-La-Neuve, Peeters, 2008.
 Leçons sur la première philosophie de Russell, Paris, Armand Colin, 1968, in reference to The Principles of Mathematics.
 Rebâtir l'Université, Paris, Fayard, 1968.
 La logique et le monde sensible. Étude sur les théories contemporaines de l'abstraction, Paris, Flammarion, 1971.
 Le Dieu d'Anselme et les apparences de la raison, Paris, Aubier, 1971.
 Nécessité ou contingence. L'aporie de Diodore et les systèmes philosophiques, Paris, Minuit, 1984, réed. 1997.
 Éléments de poétique, Paris, Vrin, 1991.
 Trois Histoires de guerre, Besançon, Cêtre, 1992.
 Dettes, Besançon, Cêtre, 1992.
 L'intuitionnisme kantien, Paris, Vrin, 1994.
 Le Miroir de Venise, Paris, Julliard, 1995.
 « Nouvelles réflexions sur l'argument dominateur : une double référence au temps dans la seconde prémisse ». In : Philosophie 55 (1997), p. 14–30.
 Mathématiques pythagoriciennes et platoniciennes. Recueil d'études, Paris, Albert Blanchard, coll. Sciences dans l'histoire, 2001.

English translations
 Necessity or Contingency. The Master Argument, Stanford, CSLI Publications, 1996 
 What are Philosophical Systems? Cambridge University Press, 1986

References

Further reading 
 G.G. Brittan Jr. (Hrsg.): Causality, Method and Modality. Essays in Honor of Jules Vuillemin. Dordrecht u.a.: Kluwer, 1991.
Pierre Pellegrin and R. Rashed, Philosophie des mathématiques et théorie de la connaissance, l'oeuvre de Jules Vuillemin, Paris, Blanchard, 2005.

External links 
  Jules Vuillemin's Lectures
  Jules Vuillemin’s Archives
  Collège de France

1920 births
2001 deaths
People from Doubs
École Normale Supérieure alumni
Academic staff of the Collège de France
20th-century French philosophers
Philosophers of science
Analytic philosophers
French male non-fiction writers
20th-century French male writers